Colobothea nigromaculata is a species of beetle in the family Cerambycidae. It was described by Dmytro Zajciw in 1971. It is known from Brazil.

References

nigromaculata
Beetles described in 1971